The MKO Abiola Statue was designed and erected by Olurotimi Ajayi in memory of Chief Moshood Abiola, a politician who was widely regarded as the winner of the inconclusive 1993 Nigerian elections. Standing at about 46 feet tall, the statue was unveiled on 12 June 2018 during the administration of Governor Akinwunmi Ambode.

Background

Moshood Kashimawo Olawale Abiola, popularly referred to as MKO Abiola (24 August 1937 – 7 July 1998) was a businessman, publisher and politician. He contested for the presidency at the 1993 Nigeria elections and was widely regarded as the winner although the final results weren't released. In 1994, he was arrested and detained in prison on charges of treason after declaring himself as the President of Nigeria. MKO Abiola died on 7 July 1998, the day he was due to be released from prison. His death was trailed by suspicious circumstances, while an official autopsy stated that Abiola died of heart attack, General Sani Abacha's Chief Security Officer said Abiola was beaten to death.

Purpose
In remembrance of the life, exploits and legacy set by Abiola, the Lagos state government through governor Akinwunmi Ambode unveiled the MKO Abiola Statue on 12 June 2018 – exactly twenty-five years after he won 12 June 1993 presidential election – in Ojota, a suburb of Lagos. The governor said the statue would remain a memorial of Abiola's legacy and the greatness that he represented to Nigeria's political landscape.

Structural description
Located at the heart of the "MKO Gardens" and standing 37 feet tall (conversion???), the MKO Abiola Statue is mounted on a 9 feet pedestal making it a 46 feet high monument. The sculpture – made of fiberglass – shows a smiling Abiola wearing a flowing agbada with his right hand raised showing the sign of peace. The MKO Abiola Statue was first designed in 2003 before it was re-designed to its current state.

Image gallery

References

2008 sculptures
Cultural infrastructure completed in 2008
Outdoor sculptures in Lagos
Monuments and memorials in Lagos
2008 establishments in Nigeria
Sculptures of men
21st-century architecture in Nigeria